The Tennessee Golf Hall of Fame was established in 1991 by the Tennessee Golf Foundation as a non-profit organization. The hall of fame is located at the "Golf House Tennessee" a 21,000 square foot golf complex in Franklin, Tennessee (near Nashville), which houses administration all of the state's golf activities, including pro golf, amateur golf, women's golf, junior golf, and turfgrass research."

Induction in to the hall of fame includes one or more of the following criteria for Tennesseans: 
a significant record as a championship player
a benefactor, promoter, administrator, or volunteer for the game
one who embodies the core values and honorable traditions of the game

The first inductees in 1992 were Lou Graham, Cary Middlecoff, Mason Rudolph. As of 2019, the hall included 51 members, including Sarah Ingram, Ted Rhodes, Katherine Graham, Toby S. Wilt, Jean St. Charles, Dick Horton and Vince Gill.

References

Golf in Tennessee
Franklin, Tennessee
1991 establishments in Tennessee
Golf museums and halls of fame